Melchizedek I was the first Catholicos-Patriarch of All Georgia, from 1010 to 1033, reigning from Ani. He is revered as a saint by the Georgian Orthodox Church. Before him, heads of the Georgian Church only bore the title of Catholicos of Kartli. The unification of Georgia into a single kingdom by Bagrat III (r. 975–1014) led to the change in title.

In 1031, Melchizedek successfully petitioned Bagrat III for tax immunity for the Church, demonstrating the important power the Church had at the time and its influence over the State.

He visited Constantinople several times, and met with the Byzantine Emperor Basil II.

Melchizedek was glorified by the Georgian Orthodox Church on October 17, 2002. His feast is celebrated on October 1.

References

1033 deaths
Saints of Georgia (country)
11th-century Christian saints
11th-century people from Georgia (country)
Catholicoses and Patriarchs of Georgia (country)
Year of birth unknown